Pseudophilautus sirilwijesundarai (Siril Wijesundara's shrub frog) is a species of frogs in the family Rhacophoridae, endemic to Sri Lanka.

Its natural habitats are wet lowland forests of Sri Lanka. It is threatened by habitat loss. It is one of the 8 species of rhacophorids that was discovered from Adam's Peak recently.

Etymology
The frog was named after Dr. Siril Wijesundara, a leading Sri Lankan scientist and naturalist.

Description
The male measures 22.3 mm and 32.5 mm female.

Original publication
 Wickramasinghe, Vidanapathirana, Rajeev, Ariyarathne, Chanaka, Priyantha, Bandara & Wickramasinghe, 2013 : Eight new species of Pseudophilautus (Amphibia: Anura: Rhacophoridae) from Sripada World Heritage Site (Peak Wilderness), a local amphibian hotspot in Sri Lanka. J Threatened Taxa,  (full text).

References

sirilwijesundarai
Endemic fauna of Sri Lanka
Frogs of Sri Lanka
Amphibians described in 2013